Wilson Memorial High School is a public school located in Fishersville, Virginia. The school is named after the 28th President of the United States, Thomas Woodrow Wilson, who was born in nearby Staunton, Virginia. WMHS, home of the Green Hornets, is located in the Woodrow Wilson Complex, which consists of the Wilson Workforce and  Rehabilitation Center, Augusta County Public Schools Board offices, Valley Vocational Technical Center, Shenandoah Valley Governor's School, Wilson Elementary School, and Wilson Middle School.

History
The school's first class began on 11 September 1947 after Augusta County acquired a portion of the land used by the United States Army's former Woodrow Wilson General Hospital during World War II. Fifteen buildings were converted into classrooms and offices for the school after the hospital's last patient departed on March 31, 1946.

By 2007 a $20 million renovation had been completed at the current Wilson Memorial.

References

External links 
 Wilson Memorial High School

Public high schools in Virginia
Schools in Augusta County, Virginia